An Englishman's Castle is a BBC television serial first broadcast in 1978, written by Philip Mackie and directed by Paul Ciappessoni. The story was set in an alternative history 1970s, in which Nazi Germany won World War II and England is run by a collaborationist fascist government. Peter Ingram (Kenneth More) is a writer for a soap opera (also called An Englishman's Castle), which is set in London in 1940, during the fictional Nazi invasion and subsequent occupation.

Plot
Peter Ingram is a successful London screenwriter, the creator of one of the most popular television shows in Nazi-occupied Europe, An Englishman's Castle. It is a period soap opera, following an ordinary London family during an imagined German invasion of England in 1940. Ingram is oblivious to Nazi rule, which is hidden behind a façade of seemingly-normal English daily life. The invasion was followed by several years of guerrilla warfare, which ended in a truce with Germany and an amnesty that enabled the resisters to resume normal daily life in return for accepting the reality of German occupation, which they generally did, feeling that further resistance was futile.

Ingram's show furthers the feeling among the population in the present (1978) and so is highly valuable to the authorities. A kind of normal was restored, with few Germans to be seen in the streets. German rule is maintained mainly through an extensive system of collaborators, known as "delators". When dissidents are detained it is done by polite, soft-spoken English police but they are then delivered to torture chambers, kept discreetly out of sight.

Ingram gradually becomes aware of the real state of things. He encounters his superiors' firm objection to the inclusion of a character with a Jewish name in the series. The series is largely based on his life, he argues and the Jewish man was a real friend. Having such a character would violate the official policy of letting the extermination of the Jews remain forgotten, never discussed openly. Ingram discovers that his mistress, Jill, one of the stars of his show, is secretly Jewish and a member of a clandestine resistance movement. Eventually, his loyalties are tested and he sides with the resistance.

When the resistance decides to include in his show the code word that will signal a nationwide insurgency, due to its huge audience, he complies, allowing Sally (Jill) to speak the phrase when it is filmed. In the closing scene, he locks himself in his office as the episode is broadcast, cuts off the feed just before her scene airs and speaks the phrase himself instead, live over the air. As the sounds of a rebellion against the collaborationist government begin to come through the windows of his office, Ingram awaits the secret police; when someone breaks down the door he turns to stare at the unseen intruder.

Cast

 Kenneth More as Peter Ingram
 Isla Blair as Jill / "Sally"
 Anthony Bate as Harmer
 Kathleen Byron as Mrs. Ingram
 Noel Dyson as Connie / "Mrs. Worth"
 Rob Edwards as Adrian / "Bert Worth"
 Fiona Gray as Susan
 Nigel Havers as Mark Ingram
 Peter Hughes as John / "Mr. Worth"
 David Meyer as Henry Ingram
 Frederick Treves as Lonsdale
 David Roy Paul as Head waiter
 Brian Peck as Jimmy
 Philip Bond as Inspector
 Anthony Stafford as Arthur / "Frank Worth"

DVD
According to the DVD cover, the series was released by Simply Media and the BBC in 2015.

See also
 Hypothetical Axis victory in World War II

External links
 

Television series about World War II alternate histories
1970s British drama television series
1978 British television series debuts
1978 British television series endings
BBC television dramas
English-language television shows